Geco is a street artist known for tagging buildings and structures in Rome.

References 

Street artists
Italian artists
Living people
Year of birth missing (living people)